Cajueiro da Praia is one of the four coastal cities of Piauí, Brazil.

The municipality contains part of the  Delta do Parnaíba Environmental Protection Area, created in 1996.

The tree has been studied by the State University of Piauí.

References 

Populated coastal places in Piaúi
Municipalities in Piauí